Meremõisa is a village in Lääne-Harju Parish, Harju County in northern Estonia. According to the 2011 Estonia Census, the population was 176 people, 163 (92.6%) of these being Estonians.

References

Villages in Harju County